3,4-DHSA is an organic compound which is the intermediate product of the metabolism of cholesterol, by the bacteria most commonly responsible for tuberculosis (Mycobacterium tuberculosis).   3,4-DHSA is an acronym for 3,4-dihydroxy-9,10-seco-androst-1,3,5(10)-triene-9,17-dione, the official name of this substance.  It is classified as a secosteroid, since one of the four rings of cholesterol from which it is derived is broken.

3,4-DHSA is a catecholic intermediate (a compound containing an aromatic ring with two adjacent hydroxyl groups) produced by M. tuberculosis during the breakdown of cholesterol. 3,4-DHSA is also produced by other bacteria such as Comamonas testosteroni.

A particular type of enzyme known as  extradiol dioxygenase is responsible for the oxidation and ring opening of 3,4-DHSA to 4,9-DSHA (see metabolic scheme below). M. tuberculosis bacteria that are deficient in this enzyme are less lethal than wild-type bacteria.  3,4-DHSA itself appears to be toxic to the bacteria while the breakdown products of 3,4-DHSA can be used as energy source by the bacteria. Hence blocking the oxidation of 3,4-DHSA by the extradiol dioxygenase enzyme may be useful in the treatment of tuberculosis.

A crystal structure of DHSA in complex with M. tuberculosis iron-dependent extradiol dioxygenase has been determined.

References

Secosteroids